Bishop of Calgary may refer to:

 the Bishop of the Anglican Diocese of Calgary
 the Bishop of the Roman Catholic Diocese of Calgary